Alfred Lee Loomis Jr. (April 15, 1913 – September 7, 1994) was an American investment banker and an American sailor and Olympic champion. He won the Bermuda race twice. In 1977, he was manager of the Independence-Courageous syndicate, the yachting team that successfully defended the America's Cup that year.

He competed at the 1948 Summer Olympics in London, where he won a gold medal in the 6 metre class with the boat Uanoria, together with Herman Whiton, James Smith, Michael Mooney, who later married his daughter, Nancy, and James Weekes.

He graduated from Harvard University in 1935 and from Harvard Law School in 1939.

He was the son of Alfred Lee Loomis and Elizabeth Ellen Farnsworth. He was married to the late Virginia Davis and had three daughters.

References

External links
 
 
 

1913 births
1994 deaths
American male sailors (sport)
Sailors at the 1948 Summer Olympics – 6 Metre
Olympic gold medalists for the United States in sailing
Medalists at the 1948 Summer Olympics
Harvard Law School alumni
Loomis family
Harvard College alumni